= Face-pic =

Defunct social networking site

Face-pic was a social networking website which at one time had almost 2.5 million subscribers, and drew a large number of its users from the 16–24 age range in the United Kingdom. The website was created by friends Dave Ames and Mark Bruce in Stevenage in December 1999; a second version of the site followed in November 2001. The website eventually fell into financial difficulties and was bought by Symbios Group in October 2008 as part of a bid to build a social networking userbase with other social sites, including ProfileHeaven.com and Faces.com, to be relaunched under the Faces brand giving the company around 1.5 million members. Some of the original user base transferred to Faces.com, which is relaunching as a free dating site.
